Mônica Salmaso (born 27 February 1971 in São Paulo, Brazil) is a música popular brasileira (MPB) singer.

Career
Mônica Salmaso started her career in the play "O Concílio do Amor", directed by Gabriel Villela in 1989.

In 1995 she recorded her first solo album Afro-sambas, accompanied by classical guitarist Paulo Bellinati, who also made the arrangements and produced the CD. It was a re-recording of the eponymous album composed in the 1960s by Baden Powell and Vinícius de Moraes.
 
In 1996, she recorded with Paulo Bellinati the song "Felicidade" (Happiness) by Tom Jobim and Vinícius de Moraes for the album "Tom Jobim Songbook", by Lumiar Records.

She was nominated for the 1997 Prêmio Sharp as Revelation singer in the category música popular brasileira.

Salmaso released in 1998 her second album, Trampolim, produced by Rodolfo Stroeter, with guest participations of Naná Vasconcelos, Toninho Ferragutti and Paulo Bellinati, among others.

In 1999 she was the winner of the second Prêmio Visa MPB – Vocal Edition, in a unanimous decision both by the jury and by popular acclaim.

In the same year she recorded her third album, Voadeira, also produced by Rodolfo Stroeter. Guest participants in the CD were, among others, Marcos Suzano, Benjamim Taubkin, Toninho Ferragutti, Paulo Bellinati and Nailor Azevedo. The São Paulo Association of Art Critics (APCA) considered it one of the ten best albums of the year, and she was awarded the APCA Award as Best Female Singer.

In 2000 she was finalist of the Festival da Música Brasileira (Brazilian Music Festival) promoted by Rede Globo, main Brazilian TV broadcaster, singing "Estrela da Manhã" by Beto Furquim.

NY Times critic Jon Pareles said of her that "Monica Salmaso has a gorgeous, quintessentially Brazilian voice: quietly lustrous and sustained, suffusing each liquid note with languid secrets". Don Heckman of LA Times said "She is an artist to be watched, one with extraordinary potential". Billboard Magazine said, "Her voice is a fluent and beautifully colored instrument".

Her albums Trampolim and Voadeira were also released in Europe, Japan, the U.S., Canada and Mexico.

The 2007 album Noites de Gala, Samba na Rua, dedicated to the music of Chico Buarque, was nominated for Best MPB Album at the 2007 Latin Grammy Awards.

In 2011 the album Alma Lírica Brasileira (Lyric Brazilian Soul) was released, a work conceived in trio with her husband Teco Cardoso (saxophones and flutes) and the conductor Nelson Ayres (piano). It was nominated for Best MPB Album at the 2011 Latin Grammy Awards, and Salmaso won the 23rd Prêmio da Música Brasileira Award as best singer of Brazilian Music.

In 2014, the album Corpo de Baile was released, containing 14 songs composed in partnership by Guinga and Paulo Cesar Pinheiro, several of them not recorded before and several kept for up to 40 years. With this work, Monica Salmaso won in 2015 the 26th Prêmio da Música Brasileira, in the Best MPB Female Singer category. A song from the album, Sedutora, was also awarded with the Best Song Award.

Mônica is married to saxophonist Teco Cardoso.

Discography
 Caipira – 2017
 Corpo de Baile – 2014
 Alma Lírica Brasileira – 2011
 Noites de Gala, ao vivo – 2009 (recorded 2008)
 Noites de Gala, Samba na Rua (DVD) – 2008
 Nem 1 ai – 2008 (recorded 2000)
 Noites de Gala, Samba na Rua – 2007
 Iaiá – 2004
 Voadeira – 1999
 Trampolim – 1998
 Afro-sambas – 1995

Besides these works, she also participated in more than 60 albums by other artists.

References

External links
 Official website
 The Lyrical Soul of Brazil – article at culturebase.net

1971 births
Living people
Música Popular Brasileira singers
Singers from São Paulo
21st-century Brazilian singers
21st-century Brazilian women singers
Women in Latin music